The Hermes Logios type is a type of statue of the Greek god Hermes, showing him in the form of Hermes Logios. It was first raised for the Athenian dead of the Battle of Coronea (447 BC).  Examples include:
Marcellus as Hermes Logios at the Louvre

References 

5th-century BC Greek sculptures
Logios